Collins v Royal National Theatre Board Ltd [2004] EWCA Civ 144; [2004] IRLR 395 is a case under the Disability Discrimination Act 1995. It concerns the duty of an employer to make reasonable accommodations for a disabled employee.

Facts
Mr Collins lost part of his finger in an accident at the Royal National Theatre’s carpentry shop, making his hand clumsy. He had worked there 18 years. He refused surgery and was dismissed.

Judgment
Sedley LJ held that there was a failure on the Theatre's part to make reasonable adjustments.

On a technical point, he held that reasons why the employer had not made any effort to adjust the workplace for the employee could not be brought up in argument if they had already been dismissed when looking at whether there was a duty to make reasonable adjustments in the first place.

See also
UK employment discrimination law
UK labour law
Human Rights Act 1998

Notes

External links
Royal National Theatre's website

United Kingdom labour case law
United Kingdom equality case law
United Kingdom disability case law
Court of Appeal (England and Wales) cases
2004 in case law
2004 in British law
Royal National Theatre